Konectbus is a bus operator based in Dereham in Norfolk, England. It is a subsidiary of the Go-Ahead Group and forms part of Go East Anglia.

History
Konectbus was formed in 1999 when the Saham Toney depot of Norfolk Green was purchased from with four coaches, originally trading as Konect. The company moved out of coach operations and into tendered bus services. In 2003, the company was renamed Konectbus.

In 2004, the depot was relocated to Toftwood. In March 2013, a new depot was opened in Rashes Green Industrial Estate. In 2005, Konectbus began to operate three park & ride services under contract to Norwich City Council with a fleet of eleven new buses.

In March 2010, Konectbus was sold to the Go-Ahead Group. In November 2017 Konectbus took over all 17 routes and 20 buses of sister company Anglian Bus.

Acquisitions

Anglian Bus was a bus operator based in Beccles. A subsidiary of the Go-Ahead Group, it operated services in both Norfolk and Suffolk from 1981 until 2017.

Anglian Bus was formed in 1981 by David and Christine Pursey, operating charter services and school services from a depot in Loddon. In January 1999, Anglian Bus began operating its first public bus service numbered 580 between Diss and Great Yarmouth under contract to Norfolk County Council.

This depot had a MOT testing facility. In 2003, the company began its first commercial service from Halesworth to Norwich. In 2004, a second depot at New Rackheath, near Norwich opened. It has since closed and is now used as an outstation by sister company Konectbus.

In April 2012, Anglian Bus was sold to the Go-Ahead Group. On 19 November 2017, Anglian Bus ceased trading with all routes and buses transferred to Konectbus.

Anglian Bus operated a number of services, both standard routes and more limited services. Both urban and rural areas were served, with many of the company's routes running into the city of Norwich serving Norwich bus station. Great Yarmouth and Lowestoft were also served by many routes. At the time operations ceased in November 2017, the fleet comprised 20 vehicles.

Services
Konectbus operate services in Norfolk and Suffolk. On 7 September 2015, Konectbus started operating a five-year contract for all six Norwich park & ride services.

Former Services
The company formerly operated route X6 from Thetford to Norwich via Attleborough. It was withdrawn in 2019.

Fleet
As at October 2017, the fleet consisted of 61 buses.

References

External links

Company website

Official website (archive copy)

Bus operators in Norfolk
Go-Ahead Group companies
Transport companies established in 1999
1999 establishments in England
Transport companies established in 1981
Transport companies disestablished in 2017
1981 establishments in England
2017 disestablishments in England